Edmond Médécin (20 November 1898 – 16 February 1951) was a Monegasque sprinter. He competed in the men's 100 metres at the 1920 Summer Olympics.

References

External links

1898 births
1951 deaths
Athletes (track and field) at the 1920 Summer Olympics
Monegasque male sprinters
Monegasque male long jumpers
Olympic athletes of Monaco
Place of birth missing